The men's decathlon event at the 1990 Commonwealth Games was held on 28 and 29 January at the Mount Smart Stadium in Auckland.

Results

References

Day 1 results
Day 2 results

Decathlon
1990